Magnum was a class of SIGINT spy satellites reportedly operated by the National Reconnaissance Office (NRO) for the United States Central Intelligence Agency (CIA). The program remains classified, and the information that exists is speculative.

Launch 
It is believed that two Magnum satellites were launched from Space Shuttle Discovery (OV-103) during the missions STS-51-C in 1985 and STS-33 in 1989. According to Jim Slade of ABC News, the second satellite, USA-48, replaced the first, USA-8, which after more than 4 years in orbit was running out of maneuvering fuel required for keeping its station over the Indian Ocean. The mission of the two satellites was to listen in to military and diplomatic communications from the Soviet Union, China, and neighbouring countries.

USA-67 satellite 
USA-67, launched aboard Space Shuttle Atlantis (OV-104) in November 1990 (STS-38 mission), was initially identified as a third Magnum satellite owing to the presence of two upper stages in orbit after its deployment, suggesting that an Inertial Upper Stage (IUS) had been used to deploy it. It was later determined that the second upper stage was from the stealthy Prowler spacecraft, and that USA-67 was a Satellite Data System (SDS-2) communications satellite.

Contractor 
The Magnum satellites, built by TRW, are rumored to have large (estimated  diameter) umbrella-like reflecting dishes to collect RF signals from Earth. The Magnum/Orion satellites replaced the older Rhyolite/Aquacade series of SIGINT satellites, and have themselves been succeeded by the Mentor/Advanced Orion satellites.

Satellites

References

Further reading 
 Richelson, Jeffrey T.; ed. U.S. Military Uses of Space, 1945-1991, Vol. 1, Guide, National Security Archive, 1991

External links 
 Information from astronautix.com
 Gunter's Space Page - information on  Magnum
 Globalsecurity- Magnum/ Mentor/ Orion

Reconnaissance satellites of the United States
Signals intelligence satellites
Military equipment introduced in the 1980s